Foothill Transit is a public transit agency that is government funded by 22 member cities in the San Gabriel and Pomona valleys. It operates a fixed-route bus public transit service in the San Gabriel Valley region of eastern Los Angeles County, California, United States, as well as a rapid bus route to and from downtown Los Angeles from the El Monte Busway, and a few of it's local routes reach the far northern and western edge cities of neighboring Orange and San Bernardino counties, respectively.

Overview 

Foothill Transit operates out of two yards: one in Pomona (opened in 1997), and the other in Arcadia (opened in 2002); the administrative offices moved to West Covina in 2007. The Foothill Transit joint powers authority membership consists of elected representatives from 22 member cities in the San Gabriel Valley and Pomona Valley and three members appointed from the Los Angeles County Board of Supervisors. These representatives are divided into five geographical clusters, which each elect a representative annually to serve on a five-member Executive Board.

Origins 
Los Angeles County Supervisor Pete Schabarum is credited with the formation of the transit agency. Schabarum, annoyed by what he saw as disproportionate cutbacks of bus service by the Southern California Rapid Transit District (SCRTD) in the San Gabriel Valley, wanted to secede from the larger agency and form a separate transit agency as early as 1986. Compared to routes serving more densely-populated areas, routes in the San Gabriel and Pomona Valleys required greater subsidies to serve fewer riders on longer freeway alignments in eastern Los Angeles County.

Foothill was initially founded by 20 member cities; Pasadena voted to join in 1998. In 1987, the Los Angeles County Transportation Commission (LACTC) approved Foothill to take over fourteen routes which serviced the San Gabriel Valley that were currently operated by SCRTD. Although service was planned to start on July 1, 1988, the Foothill Transit Zone had been prevented from starting service in July by an injunction arising from a lawsuit filed by the drivers and mechanics unions (United Transportation and Amalgamated Transit Unions) of SCRTD against LACTC. Los Angeles Superior Court Judge Eli Chernow ruled that LACTC could not unilaterally transfer the lines without the consent of the SCRTD board of directors. The injunction was upheld on appeal.

LACTC had begun withholding $9 million per month from SCRTD in April 1988 on the basis that SCRTD had not followed salary guidelines set by LACTC; SCRTD replied that LACTC, under the leadership of its chairman (Schabarum), was holding the funds hostage to pressure SCRTD to release the lines to Foothill Transit. SCRTD consented to Foothill Transit taking over the bus lines in December 1988 in return for the restoration of funding. Those first two lines operated by Foothill Transit were 495 and 498.

The trial for the lawsuit against Foothill Transit started in May 1989, was resolved in Foothill's favor by July, and the other twelve lines previously operated by SCRTD were transitioned to Foothill Transit between 1989 and 1992. For a short period in 1992, the last two routes to transition (486 and 488) were operated by both Foothill Transit and SCRTD during continued legal disputes. The drivers and mechanics unions disputed the transfer of 486 and 488 since SCRTD had made the decision without negotiating with the union; an arbitrator held up the unions' argument, which led to duplicated service on those lines, as "Foothill Transit [had] the legal right to operate buses on the contested routes, but the [SCRTD had] the legal obligation to do so", and the union planned to use that precedent to roll back service to SCRTD on all fourteen lines. However, Foothill Transit again prevailed in a February 1993 court ruling.

Contract labor 
Schabarum, who hated the influence of trade unions, chose to use contractors to operate the service. All of the operations and maintenance work for Foothill Transit are contracted out. , bus service is operated by Keolis at Pomona and Transdev at Arcadia/Irwindale.

Embree Bus Lines was the initial contractor that operated the first two lines for Foothill starting in December 1988. The hourly operating cost under Foothill Transit was reduced by up to half compared to service under SCRTD, and ridership grew, but the contract operator drivers generally earned less in both wages and fringe benefits, and had less influence over working conditions. In addition, Foothill Transit was not required to provide typical rider services such as schedules, bus stops, transit police, or telephone information. During the 1992 Los Angeles riot, Foothill Transit terminated service at El Monte rather than continue on to downtown Los Angeles. Over the first five years, Foothill Transit consistently saved money compared to SCRTD's historical costs. In 1994, Foothill reported their hourly cost of operations was $55, compared to $93 for the Los Angeles County Metropolitan Transportation Authority (Metro), with a farebox recovery ratio of 48% (compared to 32% for Metro) at a lower fare of $0.85 (compared to $1.10 for Metro, which was scheduled to increase to $1.35 later that year). In addition, Foothill reported an accident rate of 0.3 per  traveled, compared to Metro's rate of 3.3 per , although Metro's accident rate was skewed by older buses and more dense traffic in its operating area.

Foothill executives made the service essentially strike-proof by insisting that two different companies operate the two bus yards, even if it would cost more in the short term. By 1998, Foothill's contractors were Laidlaw and Ryder/ATE. However, due to bus industry consolidation, First Transit operated both yards from 2001 to mid-2007. Currently, both Foothill Transit yards are represented by unions (Arcadia by the Amalgamated Transit Union and Pomona by the Teamsters Union), but past strikes at the agency have been less than successful due to the ability of one yard to operate the other yard's service. In addition, wages are less at Foothill than at other transit operators in the region.

The contract operator drivers at Foothill were also represented by the Teamsters, but a 1994 Los Angeles Times article reported they earned an average of $11 per hour, compared to the average $18.45 per hour earned by Metro drivers. A representative of the union representing Metro's drivers, the United Transportation Union, accused Foothill of not paying its drivers a living wage; the president of the company that was then contracted to manage Foothill, William P. Forsythe, stated the  typical annual pay of a Foothill driver "isn't bad for a service industry job" and admitted it wasn't fair "compared to MTA, but they've been overpaying for years." In January 1995, the Los Angeles Times reported the majority of the 150 drivers for Laidlaw made $8.50 per hour; those drivers, represented by the Teamsters, rejected a proposed contract that offered no wage increases.

Laidlaw, which was responsible for approximately half of Foothill's fleet, operated out of the Upland Yard. The first strike against Foothill Transit started when Laidlaw drivers walked off in February 1996, asking for an immediate $1/hour raise and full medical coverage. Teamsters Local 848 officials stated that drivers could not afford private health insurance, and had to rely on county services instead. Foothill's other contractor was not affected and continued normal operations during the strike. The strike ended after thirteen days, when drivers accepted a 3% pay raise with no health coverage on a one-year contract under the threat they would be fired and replaced if they did not return to work. Shortly after the expiration of the contract, Laidlaw drivers went on strike again in June 1997, but that strike was settled within hours, as most drivers were no longer represented by the union. The reported average wages in 1998 was $9.30 per hour for Ryder/ATE drivers (represented by the Teamsters), and $9.06 per hour for Laidlaw drivers (who had previously voted to become an open shop).

Effective July 1, 2013, due to expiration of the existing management services contract and continuing conflicts of interest between the executive director, staff, and board, Foothill Transit transitioned to in house management. Executive Director Doran Barnes became the first full-time Foothill employee, and planning, procurement, and other administrative functions became Foothill functions as well. Transdev (formerly Veolia) staff continues to operate the transit stores and maintain bus shelters.

The last two lines operated by Metro (SCRTD's successor) in the eastern San Gabriel Valley were turned over to Foothill in 2016.

In 2017, Foothill Transit hired two new contractors, Keolis and Transdev, both of which are French transportation companies, to manage both of their bus storage yards. Keolis took over First Transit's role in managing the Pomona Yard and Transdev took over First Transit's, and previously MV Transportation's, role in managing the Irwindale Yard.

Environmental initiatives 
In 2002, Foothill Transit began purchasing Compressed Natural Gas (CNG) powered buses. In 2010, Foothill Transit was the first transit system to operate an all-electric battery-powered bus from Proterra. By 2013, when the last diesel-powered 2000–2001 Gillig Advantage buses were retired, Foothill Transit became around a 90 percent CNG fleet. 10 percent of the fleet is electric.

Foothill Transit's main goal is to be fully electric by 2030. On January 25, 2021, Foothill Transit received its first two all-electric double-decker buses, which were made by Alexander Dennis in the United Kingdom.

Other services 
Foothill Transit provides shuttle service for UCLA Football games, the annual Rose Bowl Game, and other special events at the Rose Bowl from the Parsons Corporation parking lot, located on Walnut St. and Fair Oaks Avenue in Pasadena.

Funding 
Foothill Transit is mainly funded by local sales tax revenue, with 75% coming from Los Angeles County Propositions A and C, California State Transportation Development Act, and the State Transit Assistance Fund. The remaining 25% comes from farebox revenue.

Routes 
All service operated as of October 22, 2017, reflecting service changes effective October 22, 2017.

Express routes 
Express services operate weekdays only in the peak direction, excluding the Silver Streak.

Local routes 
{| class=wikitable style="font-size: 95%;" |
!Route
!colspan=2|Terminals
!width=250px|via
!Notes
|-
|style="background:white; color:black" align="center" valign=top|178
|El MonteEl Monte Station
|City of IndustryPuente Hills Mall
|Los Angeles St, Pacific Av, Valinda Av, Nogales St, Colima Rd
|Selected trips serve the Baldwin Park Metrolink Station
|-
|style="background:white; color:black" align="center" valign=top|185
|AzusaAzusa Intermodal Transit Center
|City of IndustryPuente Hills Mall
|Irwindale Av, Glendora Av, Hacienda Bl, Colima Rd
|
|-
|style="background:white; color:black" align="center" valign=top|187
|PasadenaRaymond Av & Walnut St
|AzusaAzusa Intermodal Transit Center
|Colorado Bl, Foothill Bl, Rosemead Bl, Huntington Dr, Foothill Bl
|Serves Santa Anita Park, Arcadia Methodist Hospital and Westfield Santa Anita Mall on Huntington Dr between Rosemead Bl & Santa Anita Av, replacing Colorado Bl/Place between Rosemead Bl & Huntington Dr.
|-
|style="background:white; color:black" align="center" valign=top|188
|AzusaAzusa Intermodal Transit Center
|MontclairMontclair Transcenter
|Rt 66, Foothill Bl
|-
|style="background:white; color:black" align="center" valign=top|190
|El MonteEl Monte Station
|PomonaCal Poly Pomona
|Ramona Bl
|Short line trips terminate or originate at the Eastland Centre in West Covina
|-
|style="background:white; color:black" align="center" valign=top|194
|El MonteEl Monte Station
|PomonaCal Poly Pomona
|Valley Bl
|Short line trips terminate or originate at Valley Bl & Lemon Av in the City of Walnut
|-
|style="background:white; color:black" align="center" valign=top|195
|PomonaValley Bl & Humane Way
|PomonaPomona Transit Center
|Temple Av, Rio Rancho Rd, Reservoir St
|Serves Cal Poly Pomona
|-
|style="background:white; color:black" align="center" valign=top|197
|MontclairMontclair Transcenter
|PomonaPomona Transit Center
|Arrow Hwy, White Av, Fairplex Dr, Orange Grove Av
|
|-
|style="background:white; color:black" align="center" valign=top|269
|El MonteEl Monte Station
|MontebelloMontebello Town Center
|Santa Anita Av, Durfee Av
|
|-
|style="background:white; color:black" align="center" valign=top|270
|El MonteEl Monte Station
|ArcadiaArcadia L Line Station
|Peck Rd, Myrtle Av, Primrose Av, Foothill Bl
|
|-
|style="background:white; color:black" align="center" valign=top|272
|DuarteDuarte/City of Hope station
|West CovinaWest Covina Mall
|Buena Vista St, Baldwin Park Bl, Merced Av
|
Selected trips serve the Baldwin Park Metrolink Station.
|-
|style="background:white; color:black" align="center" valign=top|274
|WhittierBeverly Bl & Norwalk Bl
|Baldwin Park Metrolink Station
|Workman Mill Rd, Puente Av
|
|-
|style="background:white; color:black" align="center" valign=top|280
|AzusaAzusa Intermodal Transit Center
|City of IndustryPuente Hills Mall
|Azusa Av
|
|-
|style="background:white; color:black" align="center" valign=top|281
|GlendoraAPU/Citrus College station
|City of IndustryPuente Hills Mall
|Citrus Av, Cameron Av, Sunset Av, Gale Av
|
|-
|style="background:white; color:black" align="center" valign=top|282
|El MonteEl Monte Station
|City of IndustryPuente Hills Mall
|Valley Bl, 7th Av, Gale Av, Colima Rd
|
|-
|style="background:white; color:black" align="center" valign=top|284
|GlendoraRt 66 & Grand Av
|West CovinaWestfield Eastland
|Foothill Bl, Lone Hill Av
|
Service operates weekday and weekend peak hours only
|-
|style="background:white; color:black" align="center" valign=top|285
|City of IndustryPuente Hills Mall
|La HabraBeach Bl & La Habra Bl
|Hacienda Bl, Colima Rd, Whitter Bl
|Service operates weekday and weekend peak hours only
|-
|style="background:white; color:black" align="center" valign=top|286
|PomonaPomona Transit Center
|BreaBrea Mall
|Mission Bl, Diamond Bar Bl, 57 Freeway
|
|-
|style="background:white; color:black" align="center" valign=top|289
|City of IndustryPuente Hills Mall
|PomonaCal Poly Pomona
|Colima Rd, La Puente Rd
|
|-
|style="background:white; color:black" align="center" valign=top|291
|La VerneFoothill Bl & White Av
|PomonaPomona Market Place
|Garey Av, Foothill Bl
|Serves Pomona Transit Center (PTC).
Line 291 is fully electrified using Proterra fast-charge buses, which charge each time they return to PTC.
|-
|style="background:white; color:black" align="center" valign=top|292
|PomonaPomona Transit Center
|ClaremontClaremont Transit Center
|Towne Av, Foothill Bl, Baseline Rd
|
|-
|style="background:white; color:black" align="center" valign=top|480
|West CovinaWestfield West Covina
|MontclairMontclair Transcenter
|Walnut, Mission Bl, Indian Hill Bl
|Serves PomonaCal Poly Pomona, Mt. San Antonio College, and the Pomona Transit Center
|-
|style="background:white; color:black" align="center" valign=top|482
|City of IndustryPuente Hills Mall
|PomonaPomona Transit Center
|Colima Rd, Mission Bl, Golden Springs Dr, Diamond Bar Bl,
|Serves PomonaCal Poly Pomona
Selected weekday trips serve Gateway Circle and the Industry Park & Ride.
|-
|style="background:white; color:black" align="center" valign=top|486
|El MonteEl Monte Station
|PomonaCal Poly Pomona
|Garvey Av, Amar Rd
|
|-
|style="background:white; color:black" align="center" valign=top|488
|El MonteEl Monte Station
|GlendoraAPU/Citrus College station
|Ramona Bl, Francisquito Av, Grand Av
|
|-
|style="background:white; color:black" align="center" valign=top|492
|El MonteEl Monte Station
|MontclairMontclair Transcenter
|Santa Anita Av, Arrow Hwy, Bonita Av
|
|-
|style="background:white; color:black" align="center" valign=top|690
|AzusaAzusa Intermodal Transit Center
|MontclairMontclair Transcenter
|210 Freeway, Foothill Bl
|
|-
|style="background:white; color:black" align="center" valign=top|860
|Duarte|Duarte|Huntington Dr, Royal Oaks Dr, Mountain Av (Loop)
|
|-
|style="background:white; color:black" align="center" valign=top|     861
|Duarte|Duarte|Huntington Dr, Royal Oaks Dr, Mountain Av (Loop)
|
|}

 School supplementary routes 
Services operate weekdays only. Schedules subject to change June 1  — September 1 & December 22  — January 3 for Lines 853 and 854.

 Bus fleet 

 Active Fleet 
With the retirement of the 2000 and 2001 Gillig Advantage fleet in 2014, the entire current fleet now consists of 100% clean air buses, which either run on electricity or compressed natural gas (CNG). Only about one-tenth of the entire fleet is electric.On OrderRetired'''

References

External links 

 
 May 2006 Footnotes detailing Silver Streak service
 Electric bus order 2013 September

Public transportation in the San Gabriel Valley
Transportation in Pasadena, California
Bus transportation in California
Transit authorities with natural gas buses
Transit agencies in California
San Gabriel Valley
Transdev